Caitlin Gould (born 19 July 1999) is an Australian rules footballer who plays for Adelaide in the AFL Women's (AFLW).

References

External links
 
 

Living people
1999 births
Adelaide Football Club (AFLW) players
Australian rules footballers from South Australia
Sportswomen from South Australia